General Electric's BWR product line of boiling water reactors represents the designs of a relatively large (~18%) percentage of the commercial fission reactors around the world.

The progenitor of the BWR line was the 5 MW Vallecitos Boiling Water Reactor (VBWR), brought online in October 1957. Six design iterations, BWR-1 through BWR-6, were introduced between 1955 and 1972. 

This was followed by the Advanced Boiling Water Reactor (ABWR) introduced in the 1990s and the Economic Simplified Boiling Water Reactor (ESBWR) introduced in the early 2010s. 

As of August 2018, 83 reactors of this design family have been built, of which 67 reactors are operational. 

The design garnered world attention in the aftermath of the INES level 7 Fukushima Daiichi nuclear disaster of 11 March 2011. GE had been a major contractor to the Fukushima Daiichi Nuclear Power Plant in Japan, which consisted of six boiling water reactors of GE design. The reactors for Units 1, 2, and 6 were supplied by General Electric, the other three by Toshiba and Hitachi. Unit 1 was a 460 MW boiling water reactor from the BWR-3 design iteration introduced in 1965 and constructed in July 1967. 

After the plant became severely damaged in the Tōhoku earthquake and tsunami, loss of reactor core cooling led to three nuclear meltdowns, three hydrogen explosions, and the release of radioactive contamination in Units 1, 2 and 3 between 12 and 15 March. Safe operation of this reactor design family depends on continued coolant flow at all times during operation, and for a quite a while after operation ceases.

History
The progenitor of the BWR line was the 5 MW Vallecitos Boiling Water Reactor (VBWR), brought online in October 1957.

BWR-1
 BWR Type 1 (BWR-1, BWR/1): In 1955 GE developed their original VBWR design into the 197 MW Dresden 1 (6×6, 7×7) reactor, embodying the first iteration of GE's BWR/1 design. Dresden 1 used forced circulation (via external recirculation pumps) and a unique dual cycle (direct+indirect) heat transfer design that proved to be uneconomical. GE further developed the BWR-1 design with the 70 MW Big Rock Point (9×9, 11×11, 12×12) reactor, which (like all GE BWR models following Dresden 1) used the more economical direct cycle method of heat transfer, but disposed with the external recirculation pumps in favor of natural circulation (an unusual strategy that only the 55 MW Dodewaard reactor adopted, although this technique has been resurrected for the newest Gen III+ ESBWR). The 65 MW Humboldt Bay (6×6, 7×7) reactor followed Big Rock Point, returning to the more efficient forced circulation method (via external recirculation pumps). These experimental designs (all of which shared the BWR-1 classification despite their divergent designs) used fuel rod bundles in 6×6, 7×7, 8×8, 9×9, 11×11, and 12×12 configurations, but GE's 9×9 bundle later used in BWR/2–6 reactors is different from the one used in the BWR/1 era. The BWR/1 was the first BWR design with internal steam separation. It also had an isolation condenser, and pressure suppression containment.

BWR-2
 BWR Type 2 (BWR-2, BWR/2): Introduced in 1963, >500 MWe, typically around 650 MWe gross (Oyster Creek, Nine Mile Point 1). Included a large direct cycle. 5 recirculation loops, variable speed external recirculation pumps (one pump per loop, each pump's flow rate could be varied from ). This design, as well as the BWR/3–6, would all later be classified as Generation II reactors for their increased scale, improved safety features, commercial viability, profitability, and long lifetime.

BWR-3
 BWR Type 3 (BWR-3, BWR/3): Introduced in 1965, 800 MW (Dresden 2–3). First use of internal jet pumps (single nozzle, 10 per loop, 20 total). 2 recirculation loops, variable speed recirculation pumps (one pump per loop, each pump had a rated flow of ). Improved ECCS spray and flood, improved feedwater spargers. Monticello and Pilgrim 1 had significantly lower power ratings despite also being classified as BWR/3 models.

BWR-4

 BWR Type 4 (BWR-4, BWR/4): Introduced in 1966, 1100 MW (Browns Ferry 1–3). Largely similar to the BWR/3 in design with an identical recirculation system, but power density was increased by 20%. Available with either Mark I or Mark II containment.

BWR-5
 BWR Type 5 (BWR-5, BWR/5): Introduced in 1969, 1100 MW (LaSalle 1–2). Same number of loops (2) & jet pumps (20), but the jet pumps were upgraded to a five nozzle design. Improved ECCS valve flow control. Only available with Mark II containment.

BWR-6
 BWR Type 6 (BWR-6, BWR/6): Introduced in 1972, available in configurations ranging from 600–1400 MW. Transitioned from 7×7 to 8×8 fuel bundle with longer and thinner fuel rods that fit within the same external footprint as the previous 7×7 fuel bundle, reduced fuel duty (to 13.4 kW/ft (44 kW/m)), improved compact jet pumps with higher circulation capacity (available with 16–24 total jet pumps depending on the configuration), increased capacity of the steam separators and dryers, increased fuel capacity, increased output (20% increase vs. BWR/5 when using the same size pressure vessels), improved ECCS, introduced an option for a compact control room, and introduced a solid-state nuclear system protection system option (only Clinton took this). First and only model available with Mark III containment.

ABWR
 ABWR: Higher safety margins, no external recirculation loops, reactor internal pumps. It also has fine motion control rod drives.

ESBWR
 ESBWR: Passive safety, natural circulation (no loops or pumps), 1600 MW. It has a gravity flooder, isolation condenser, and passive containment cooling.

Fuel Rod Bundles

GE-2
 7x7 fuel bundle.

GE-3
 Improved 7x7 fuel bundle with 49 fuel rods, one of which is segmented.

GE-4
 8x8 fuel bundle with 63 fuel rods and 1 water rod.

GE-5
 Retrofit 8x8 fuel bundle Prepressurized and Barrier fuel bundles containing 62 and two water rods.

GE-6 & 7

GE-8
 8x8 fuel bundle with 58 to 62 fuel rods and 2-6 water rods.

GE-9

Containment

Mark I
  
A drywell containment building which resembles an inverted lightbulb above the wetwell which is a steel torus containing water.

Mark II

Described as an "over-under" configuration with the drywell forming a truncated cone on a concrete slab. Below is a cylindrical suppression chamber made of concrete rather than just sheet metal.

Mark III
The GE Mark III Containment-system is a single barrier pressure containment and multi-barrier fission containment system, consisting of the containment vessel plus associated dry- and wetwell (pressure and fission barriers), the external shield building of it, the auxiliary building and the fuel building, all of which are normally kept at negative pressure which prevents the egress of fission products.

Features of the containment :

Improved seismic response
Lower pressure containment design, but significant larger volume than Mark I and II
Improved pipe whip design
Combines the dry containment (PWR-type) with the typical BWR-pressure suppression type containment

Advantages
One advantage of the BWR design (compared to PWR) is improved load-following by virtue of control rod manipulation combined with changing the recirculation flow rate.  The integration of the turbine pressure regulator and control system with the recirculation flow control system allows automatic power changes of up to 25% of rated power without altering control rod settings.
Bottom-entry bottom-mounted control rods allow refueling without removal of the control rods and drives, while also allowing drive testing with an open vessel prior to fuel loading.
BWR allow lower primary coolant flow than PWR.
Jet pumps internal to the reactor vessel provide 2/3rds of the recirculation flow, allowing the external recirculation flow loop to be small and compact compared to contemporary PWR designs.
Under loss of coolant jet pumps provide 10% power similar to boilers.
BWR designs operate constantly at about half the primary system pressure of PWR designs while producing the same quantity and quality of steam in a compact system: 1020 psi (7 MPa) reactor vessel pressure, and 288 °C temperature for BWR which is lower than 2240 psi (14.4 MPa) and 326 °C for PWR.
Steam is generated in the reactor pressure vessel in a BWR, whereas it is generated in the steam generator on a second loop in a PWR.
BWR allows for bulk boiling while PWR doesn't.

Disadvantages

Steam generated in a BWR contains trace amounts of radioactive materials, as a result, large portions of the Turbine Building are compartmentalized to prevent radiation exposure to workers.  PWR Turbine Buildings, on the other hand, are essentially the same as a fossil fuel power plant's Turbine Building with all equipment accessible at all times.

See also
 Nuclear power
 Generation I reactor
 Generation II reactor
 Generation III reactor
 Nuclear safety in the U.S.
 Economics of new nuclear power plants
 Pressurized water reactor
 Reduced moderation water reactor
 Advanced Heavy Water Reactor
Other Gen III+ designs:
AP1000
EPR
US-APWR
ACR
VVER-TOI
Kerena boiling water reactor

References

Nuclear power reactor types
Nuclear power in the United States
Boiling water reactors
Nuclear power stations using advanced boiling water reactors